Haviland & Co. is a manufacturer of Limoges porcelain in France, begun in the 1840s by the American Haviland family, importers of porcelain to the US, which has always been the main market.  Its finest period is generally accepted to be the late 19th century, when it tracked wider artistic styles in innovative designs in porcelain, as well as stoneware and sometimes other ceramics.

History
American David Haviland was a New York-based importer/exporter who recognized the quality of French porcelains and wished to import them for an American clientele.  Charles Haviland explained his father’s history as such: 

"In 1839, my father was an importer of English Porcelain and earthenware in New York, when he happened to see a French porcelain tea service that had, I know not how, found its way across the Atlantic.  My father found the material of this service quite superior to that of the English porcelain and earthenware that had been the object of his trade and thought it would be a good thing to be the first in America to introduce tableware very superior to that in use in his country at that time…he went to France with his samples, asking anyone he thought might know, in what locality they had been made.  Finally, in Paris, he was told it had to be Limoges porcelain."

While others were selling French wares, and this story is a little romantic, David Haviland fully recognized the quality of French wares and decide to change his import business completely by only bringing in French porcelains.  He committed by moving to France in 1842 and by sending wares directly to his brothers who remained in New York. He quickly realized that to get the wares that he wanted that were palatable to an American consumer he would need to open his own factory and to control the decorating process himself.  Their new company was called Haviland Brothers & Company.  Before David Haviland, pieces were crafted in Limoges and then sent to Paris for decoration, often these decorators would add their own marks to the pieces.  Haviland found this to be inefficient and made it difficult to control the quality of the product being produced.  He also found that Parisian decorators were not willing to modify their designs to suit an American taste.  Americans, in general, preferred the English style of decoration. Therefore, Haviland opened his own school for decorators where he could have them trained in a style that combined English and French design that would appeal to an American market.  This cut out the need to send wares to Paris and allowed Haviland to precisely estimate how much it would cost to create his wares.

Early on in operations, Haviland acquired white blanks from other porcelain manufactories in Limoges and decorated the wares in-house.  Some of these blanks were already decorated in high-fire colors, which required a kiln that could reach temperatures high enough to burn porcelain.  The factory did have a muffle kiln which got sufficiently hot enough to set low-fire colors and to add gilding, which burns at the lowest temperature.  The factory did not have a high-fire kiln until 1853 when they applied for permission to build two of them.  Haviland did not acquire the ability to significantly produce porcelains completely in-house until 1865.

Due to Haviland Brothers & Company’s market success, they significantly altered the porcelain market in France.  Their streamlined business model and market dominance meant that other firms had to copy their innovations or be squeezed out.  By 1853 they were the largest importer of French porcelain into the United States.  Limoges seemed to be particularly popular in North America in four market regions: in French Canada, New York, Mississippi Valley, and in the southeastern United States as a whole.  Its popularity in the Antebellum south is shown in the fact that it had subsidiaries in Augusta, Charleston, and Mobile. This also means that during the Civil War and immediately afterwards, Haviland & Co. lost a large share of its buyers who were preoccupied with war. 

The effects of the Civil War were so pronounced that Haviland Brothers & Co. had to close its doors.  David Haviland saw this as an opportunity to go into business for himself and rebranded his new company Haviland and Company.  He also brought his two sons, Charles Edward and Theodore into the company.  Charles Edward quickly took over the day to day operations from his father and Theodore moved to the United States to handle the side of the business that had formerly belonged to their uncles – the exporting and promoting of Haviland China.  

The company continued to be managed by the two brothers with Charles Edward largely in control and managing the day to day operations and Theodore in America until 1879 when Theodore moved back to France.  Both brothers in one location proved to be too much for either and they decided to dissolve their partnership in 1891.  Charles Edward continued with the business and Theodore opened his own business, Theodore Haviland, Limoges, in 1893.  The two companies competed bitterly until Charles Edward’s death in 1921, the company folded in 1931.  In 1941 William Haviland, Theodore’s son, bought the rights to the Haviland & Company name and began production of wares after World War II.   

The Haviland company has since been overseen by grandson William Haviland, and great-grandson Theodore Haviland II.

Present Day 
Haviland & Co. is still operating as Haviland Company, though the facilities are now modernized and now sell silverware, crystal, and giftware in addition to porcelain.

Porcelain

Many of the older pieces are still in existence and are desirable as an antique or collectable. It is estimated that there are as many as 60,000 Haviland porcelain patterns, though it is difficult to determine as many of the patterns have never been formally named or catalogued, and factory records are incomplete. Attempts to catalogue the pieces have resulted in several systems, including the creation of Schleiger numbers, and informal naming by collectors.

Schleiger Numbers
This numbering system was developed by Arlene Schleiger beginning in the 1930s and was published in 6 volumes, and covered approximately 4000 examples of Haviland & Co. porcelain.34372

Prominent examples
Haviland has produced many prominent pieces, including:
 A "solferino" (purple bordered) hard-paste service in 1861 for use in the White House during the administration of Abraham Lincoln.

Gallery

References

Bibliography

External links 
 
 Haviland Collectors International Foundation

Ceramics manufacturers of the United States
Ceramics manufacturers of France
Porcelain of France
Limoges
Companies based in Nouvelle-Aquitaine